A peg cell is a non-ciliated epithelial secretory cell within the uterine tube (oviduct or Fallopian tube). These cells represent one of three epithelial cell types found within the normal fallopian tube epithelium and only make up around 10% of the total number of cells. The other two cell types are ciliated columnar and intercalary cells. The ratio of these remaining cells is dictated by an individual's hormone status. Peg cells secrete nutrients for the egg cell.

Function
Thought to represent a quiescent maturational stage of secretory cells.

See also 

List of distinct cell types in the adult human body

List of human cell types derived from the germ layers

References

External links
 
 

Human cells
Mammal female reproductive system
Epithelial cells